The 2018 AFL Women's season was the second season of the AFL Women's competition, the highest level senior Australian rules football competition in Australia. The season featured eight clubs, ran from 2 February until 24 March, and comprised a 7-game home-and-away season followed by a grand final featuring the top two clubs.

Rule changes
Three rules were changed heading into the 2018 season:
A free kick is paid against a player who last touches the ball before it goes out of bounds under the following conditions,
A free kick will be awarded against a player who kicks or handballs the football over the boundary line without the football being touched by another player;
Except where a player who does not have possession stops the football being touched by an opposition player by shepherding the football across the boundary line where the football could have otherwise been touched.
If in doubt the umpires are instructed to throw the ball in.
The interchange has been reduced to five players from six players in 2017.
Time-on will occur during the last two minutes of each quarter.

Premiership season

The full fixture was released on Friday 27 October 2017. Notable features of the draw include:
Unlike the previous season, there were no double-headers with men's preseason matches.
Adelaide, GWS, and Melbourne each hosted matches at grounds outside of their home metropolitan area with trips to Darwin, Moe, Canberra and Alice Springs respectively.
Carlton and Collingwood featured in the most free-to-air televised matches (three), Adelaide, Brisbane, Melbourne and the Western Bulldogs had two each, while GWS and Fremantle had one each.
Many games were scheduled for the late afternoon to avoid the summer heat, especially in Brisbane and Western Australia.
All starting times are local.

Round 1

Round 2

Round 3

Round 4

Round 5

Round 6

Round 7

Win/Loss table

Bold – Home game
X – Bye
Opponent for round listed above margin
This table can be sorted by margin, winners are represented in the first half of each column, and losers are represented in the second half of each column once sorted

Ladder

Ladder progression
Numbers highlighted in green indicates the team finished the round inside the top 2.
Numbers highlighted in blue indicates the team finished in first place on the ladder in that round.	
Numbers highlighted in red indicates the team finished in last place on the ladder in that round.

Grand final

In the absence of a finals series, the two teams who finished the highest on the ladder at the end of the home and away season played in the AFL Women's Grand Final.

Attendances

By club

By ground

Awards
The league best and fairest was awarded to Emma Kearney.
The Rising Star was awarded to Chloe Molloy.
The best on ground in the AFL Women's Grand Final was awarded to Monique Conti.
The goal of the year was awarded to Aliesha Newman.
The mark of the year was awarded to Tayla Harris.
AFLW Players Association awards
The most valuable player was awarded to Courtney Gum.
The most courageous player was awarded to Chelsea Randall.
The best captain was awarded to Daisy Pearce.
The best first year player was awarded to Chloe Molloy.
Chelsea Randall was named the captain of the 2018 AFL Women's All-Australian team. The grand finalists, Western Bulldogs and Brisbane Lions, along with Melbourne each had 4 players selected, with all eight clubs represented in the final team by at least one player.

Best and fairest

AFLW leading goalkicker
Numbers highlighted in blue indicates the player led the season's goal kicking tally at the end of that round.
Underlined numbers indicates the player did not play that round.

Coach changes

Club leadership

See also
2017 AFL Women's draft

References

External links

 Official AFL Women's website

 
AFL Women's seasons
2018 in Australian rules football